Albert Cole (born 7 July 1981 in Freetown) is a Sierra Leonean former international footballer, who played as a midfielder until his retirement in 2014.

He began his career with local club Mighty Blackpool in the Sierra Leonean Premier League.

External links
http://slifa.org/global/players/profiles/player_3.aspx

1981 births
Living people
Raufoss IL players
Norwegian First Division players
Sierra Leonean footballers
Sierra Leonean expatriate footballers
Expatriate footballers in Norway
Sportspeople from Freetown
Sierra Leone Creole people
Mighty Blackpool players
Sierra Leonean expatriate sportspeople in Norway
Sierra Leonean emigrants to Norway
Association football midfielders
Sierra Leone international footballers